The Troy Sentinel was a semi-weekly newspaper published between 1823–1832, which served Rensselaer County in upstate New York. It was published in historic downtown Troy at 225 River Street.

History 
The newspaper is famously known for the first published edition of the poem "A Visit from St. Nicholas", also known as "The Night Before Christmas" and “Twas the Night Before Christmas," its first line. It was published anonymously on December 23, 1823 and is generally attributed to Clement Clarke Moore.

In July 2012 Gramercy Communications moved their corporate offices into the former home of the Troy Sentinel. The company provided the Troy Public Library a grant to digitize the full collection of the newspaper.

References 
 https://web.archive.org/web/20121013045312/http://www.gramercycommunications.com/general/gramercy-communications-recognized-for-preserving-history-2/
 http://www.nysl.nysed.gov/nysnp/142.htm
 http://www.troyrecord.com/articles/2012/07/24/news/doc500e1c962d37f124187691.txt
 http://www.troyrecord.com/articles/2012/07/23/news/doc500cca24accca328252384.txt
 http://www.timesunion.com/local/article/Troy-Sentinel-to-be-preserved-3728556.php
 http://www.bizjournals.com/albany/news/2012/06/07/gramercy-communications-will-leave.html

Defunct newspapers published in New York (state)
Troy, New York
Publications established in 1823